The M110 155mm Projectile is an artillery shell used by the U.S. Army and U.S. Marine Corps. The M110 was originally designed as a chemical artillery round to deliver blister agents via howitzer as a replacement for the World War I-era 75mm chemical projectiles.  The design was later repurposed as a white phosphorus smoke round for marking, signaling, and screening purposes. The white phosphorus variants of the shell also have a secondary, incendiary effect.

Original design
Officially designated Projectile, 155mm howitzer, M110, the original round was a 26.8-inch (68.1 cm), steel shell with a rotating band near its base and a burster rod down its center. The original shell typically contained   of Sulfur mustard (H) or distilled sulfur mustard (HD), which would fill the hollow space in the shell. Both versions were designed for employment by the M114 Howitzer and the M44 Self-Propelled Howitzer for use as terrain denial (in the case of the mustard-filled versions), target-marking, and obscuration (in the case of the white phosphorus versions.)

Design variants and markings

M110
The original version of the shell came in two variations, one filled with mustard (HD) (Projectile, Gas, Persistent, HD, 155mm Howitzer, M110) and one filled with  white phosphorus (WP) (Projectile, Smoke, WP, 155mm Gun, M110).  To distinguish between the two, the HD versions were gray marked with two, horizontal, green bands, like most other chemical artillery shells.  The WP versions were gray with a single, horizontal, yellow band, as is standard for military smoke munitions.

Both versions are now considered obsolete, with the WP version seeing updated versions in later incarnations of the shell.

The HD version has not been produced since the 1960s and was never used in combat.  Remaining stockpiles of the HD version are in the process of being destroyed in accordance with the 1997 Chemical Weapons Convention.

M110A1
The first upgrade to the M110 shell is only slightly modified from the original, maintaining the  white phosphorus filler weight of the original with slight modifications to the release mechanisms to make the shell more reliable.  It is primarily used for signaling and small-scale screening missions. The M110A1 is gray with a single, yellow, horizontal band, which is standard for military smoke munitions.

M110A2
The second upgrade to the M110 shell is more dramatically modified from the other two variants with thinner casing to increase the amount of filler that can be placed in the shell. The M110A2 contains  of white phosphorus, which increases the duration of the smoke it produces.  This change makes the M110A2 ideal for target marking and large-scale obscuration missions.  The M110A2 is gray with a single, yellow, horizontal band, which is standard for military smoke munitions.

Similar projectiles
M104 155mm Projectile
M121 155mm Projectile
M687 155 mm Projectile

References

155mm artillery shells
Chemical weapon delivery systems
Chemical weapons of the United States